Ward 4 Parkdale—High Park is a municipal electoral division in Toronto, Ontario that has been represented in the Toronto City Council since the 2018 municipal election. It was last contested in 2022, with Gord Perks elected councillor for the 2022–2026 term.

History 
The ward was created in 2018 when the provincial government aligned Toronto's then-44 municipal wards with the 25 corresponding provincial and federal ridings. The current ward is an amalgamation of the old Ward 13 (western section), the old Ward 14 (eastern section).

2018 municipal election 
Ward 4 was first contested during the 2018 municipal election. Then-Ward 14 incumbent Gord Perks, who had served since 2006 was elected with 44.55 per cent of the vote.

2022 municipal election 
Incumbent Gord Perks secured re-election in a competitive race against fellow progressive Chemi Lhamo.

Geography 
Parkdale—High Park is part of the Toronto and East York community council.

It is bounded on the west by the Humber River, and on the east by rail lines used for Metrolinx operations, Dufferin Street and Lake Shore Boulevard. The ward's north boundary follows the Canadian Pacific Railway track just south of St. Clair Avenue, and the south boundary is Lake Ontario.

Councillors

Election results

See also 

 Municipal elections in Canada
 Municipal government of Toronto
 List of Toronto municipal elections

References

External links 

 Councillor's webpage

Toronto city council wards
2018 establishments in Ontario